Berezovsky or Berezowski is a surname of Slavic-language origin.
Family nest of Berezovsky (gentry) is Bereziv village (nowadays 4 villages) in Ivano-Frankivsk region, Ukraine.

People 
 Antoni Berezowski (1847–1916), Polish revolutionary
 Barbara Berezowski (born 1954), Canadian ice-dancer
 Boris Berezovsky (businessman) (1946–2013), Russian businessman
 Boris Berezovsky (pianist) (born 1969), Russian pianist
 David Berezovski (1896–1943), Polish-Jewish journalist and writer
 Denis Berezovsky (born 1974), Ukrainian and Crimean Navy officer 
 Igor Berezovsky (1942–2007), Russian painter, printmaker, and graphic designer
 Maksym Berezovsky (1745–1777), Ukrainian composer, opera singer, and violinist
 Maksymilian Berezowski (1923–2001), Polish author, journalist, and erudite scholar
 Mikhail Mikhailovich Berezovsky (1848-1912), Russian naturalist, ethnologist, and explorer
 Nicolai Berezowsky (1900–1953), American violinist and composer born in Russia
 Roman Berezovsky (born 1974), Armenian international football player
 Shaul Berezovsky (1908–1975), Polish and Israeli composer and orchestra director
 Vitali Berezovski (born 1984), Ukrainian football player
 Sholom Noach Berezovsky (1911-2000), Slonimer Rebbe

See also 
 Beryozovsky (disambiguation) (Beryozovskaya, Beryozovskoye), alternatively spelled "Berezovsky"

Russian-language surnames
Polish-language surnames
Ukrainian-language surnames